Barcelona Province may refer to:
 Barcelona Province, Spain
 Barcelona Province (Venezuela), 1520–1864

Province name disambiguation pages